The Crux is the sixth studio album from the US band Hurt. It was originally to be released on April 24, 2012, on Carved Records label, but was delayed one week to May 1, 2012. The first single, "How We End Up Alone", was released through iTunes on January 3, 2012. The album was reached number 6 on Billboard's Top Hard Rock Albums chart for 2012.

Track listing

Chart history

Album

Singles

Personnel
Hurt
J. Loren Wince - vocals, guitar, violin, banjo, string arrangement
Michael Roberts - guitar
Rek Mohr - bass
Victor Ribas - drums

Production
John Kurzweg - mixing

References

Hurt (band) albums
2012 albums